The 2021 Italian Open (also known as the Rome Masters or the Internazionali BNL d'Italia for sponsorship reasons) was a professional tennis tournament played on outdoor clay courts at the Foro Italico in Rome, Italy from  9 – 16 May 2021. It was the 78th edition of the Italian Open and is classified as an ATP Tour Masters 1000 event on the 2021 ATP Tour and a WTA 1000 event on the 2021 WTA Tour.

Champions

Men's singles

  Rafael Nadal def.  Novak Djokovic, 7–5, 1–6, 6–3

Women's singles

  Iga Świątek def.  Karolína Plíšková, 6–0, 6–0

Men's doubles

  Nikola Mektić /  Mate Pavić def.  Rajeev Ram /  Joe Salisbury, 6–4, 7–6(7–4)

Women's doubles

  Sharon Fichman /  Giuliana Olmos def.  Kristina Mladenovic /  Markéta Vondroušová, 4–6, 7–5, [10–5]

Points and prize money

Point distribution

Prize money

*per team

References

External links